Aabye is a Danish surname. Notable people with this surname include the following:

Dag Aabye (born 1941), Norwegian-Canadian runner
Edgar Aabye (1865–1941), Danish tug of war Olympian
Finn Aabye (born 1935), Danish film producer
Jørgen Aabye (1868–1959), Danish painter
Karen Aabye (1904–1982), Danish writer
Søren Aabye Kierkegaard (1813–1855), Danish philosopher and theologian

Danish-language surnames
Surnames of Danish origin